Kentucky Route 467 is a 41.287-mile state highway in Kentucky that runs from KY 227 just west of Worthville to KY 177 just west of DeMossville.

Route description

KY 467 begins at KY 227 just west of Worthville and runs east through Worthville. It joins KY 36 at an area, which no longer exists, called Eagle Station before both routes enter Sanders. In Sanders, KY 36 and 467 split. KY 36 goes to the right while KY 467 goes to the left with KY 47. Just after crossing the railroad tracks, KY 467 branches to the right while KY 47 heads north for Ghent. A few miles later, KY 467 enters Sparta and joins KY 35 to the right and runs with KY 35 for a couple hundred feet before branching to the left. After KY 467 enters Glencoe, it meets US 127 and merges to the right for a couple hundred feet before branching to the left. After it enters into Dry Ridge, it meets KY 22 and joins it for 3.2 miles as it bypasses Dry Ridge to the north and east. KY 467 meets Interstate 75 just after joining KY 22. KY 467 and KY 22 meet US-25 north of the city and use the newer Dry Ridge Bypass to bypass the city to the north. On the east side of the city, it branches from US 25 and KY 22 and heads east again. KY 467 turns to the north before meeting Kentucky Route 17. KY 467 uses KY 17 for a short bit before KY 467 branches to the right. In less than a mile, KY 467 comes to an end at KY 177, just west of DeMossville.

Major intersections

References

0467